The Party of Labour and Progress of Melilla is a political party in Melilla, Spain. Its unclear whether the party is still active.

Labour parties
Political parties in Melilla